Middlebush Reformed Church known as "the church with the red doors", is located at 1 South Middlebush Road at the corner of Amwell Road in Franklin Township, Somerset County, New Jersey, United States. It is the fourth oldest church in Franklin Township. It was organized in 1834, and the New York Times noted their first church was built in Colonial times and was one of the landmarks of the region. The church is a contributing property of the Middlebush Village Historic District that was added to the National Register of Historic Places on April 24, 2007.

The church is a part of the Reformed Church in America.

History
It was organized by Dutch settlers on March 19, 1834 in the Colonial Farms area of what is now Franklin Township, Somerset County, New Jersey. The initial three member committee included the first Reverend of the church Jacob Schultz. The settlers had "migrated from Manhattan Island seeking more tillable land". Residents were previously traveling to Reformed churches in Hillsborough, New Jersey; Franklin Park, New Jersey; or New Brunswick. The few Dutch families initially met in a barn "in what is now O'Connor's Beef 'N Chowder House on Amwell Road" owned by the Voorhees family. One descendant, Mary Amanda Voorhees, "Miss Amanda", later served as the church's organist for forty-five years. "[S]ervices continued there until 1835, when the white frame church was completed". Three locations for the church building were considered: one on Amwell Road north of the current location, one on South Middlebush Road south of the railroad tracks, and the current location on the corner of South Middlebush Road and Amwell Avenue.  One acre of land was given for the church lot and about five more acres continuing along South Middlebush Road were purchased by the church.  The acreage was divided into smaller lots and sold off in 1839.  The cornerstone of the church building was laid on June 7, 1834.  During construction, the search for a pastor began. Jacob I. Schultz (1792-1852), the pastor at Whitehouse Station, New Jersey and Lebanon, New Jersey was contacted.  The new church building was dedicated on February 19, 1835. The final cost was $3,989. Schultz was formally installed as pastor on December 30, 1835.

Lightning destroyed the church building on July 2, 1917, the New York Times noted part of the furniture was saved and the loss was estimated at $50,000. Congregation members who lived nearby rescued furniture and the church membership book. A kerosene lamp was saved, and is currently hanging in the church. Planning for the new building at the same site started immediately but construction was delayed by World War I. The Gothic revival building was rebuilt using stone from the Martinsville, New Jersey quarry. The church was rededicated in 1919.

In 1972 the church set up a "mini" school.

In 2003 the church started a living nativity which includes four readings from the Bible and ends with the adoration of the magi. The annual Christmastime event includes "costumed characters, live animals and carollers".

The church celebrated their 175th anniversary in 2009. They buried and sealed a time capsule to be opened at the congregation's 200th anniversary in 2034, 25 years later.

Pastors
Pastors have included the following:
 Jacob I. Schultz (1792-1852), 1834-1837
 John Addison Van Doren, 1838-1865
 George Swain (pastor), 1866-1868
 Stephen L. Mershon, 1869–1874
 James Le Fevre, 1875-1902
 John A. Thomson (pastor), 1902-1920 
 Frank A. Langwith, 1921-1926
 Harold W. Nelson, 1926-1928
 Russell W. Shepherd, 1928-1930
 Marinus Den Herder, 1931-1932
 Cornelius Van Leeuwen, 1934-1937
 Frank A. Langwith, 1937–1948
 David W. Jenks, student, 1949-1952 
 Vernon L. Dethmers, 1952-1960
 Charles B. Bridgman, 1961-1973
 Ronald L. VanderBeek, 1974-1986
 John J. Arnone, assistant, 1981–1982
 Gerald L. Vermilye, interim, 1986
 Taylor Holbrook, 1986-1998
 Ross Rettig, 1999-2001
 George Montanari, 2002-current

Notes

Further reading
 Centennial historical account of the Middlebush Reformed Church, Middlebush, N.J., 1834-1934. Middlebush Reformed Church (N.J.), 1934.
 Historical discourse delivered at the semi-centennial anniversary of the Reformed Church of Middlebush, N.J. James Le Ferve, Daily and Weekly Home News Printing House, 1884.
 Favorite recipes of the Middlebush Reformed Church, Middlebush Reformed Church (N.J.), Cookbook Publishers, 1978.
 Writings on American history: Volume 38 of Carnegie Institution of Washington publication Annual report (American Historical Association), KTO Press, 1938.
 The Churches speak on--women's ordination: official statements from religious bodies and ecumenical organizations, J. Gordon Melton, Gary L. Ward, The Churches speak series, Gale Research, 1991, 0810376474, 9780810376472.
 Historical discourse delivered at the seventy-fifth anniversary of the Reformed Church of Middlebush, N.J., John A. Thomson, Published by the Consistory, 1909.
 Historical discourse on occasion of the centennial anniversary of the Reformed Dutch Church of Millstone, Edward Tanjore Corwin, J.J. Reed, Printer, 1866.
 Pre-revolutionary Dutch houses and families in northern New Jersey and southern New York, Rosalie Fellows Bailey, Holland Society of New York, Dover Publications, 1968.

External links
Middlebush Reformed Church Official Website

Churches in Somerset County, New Jersey
Franklin Township, Somerset County, New Jersey
Reformed Church in America churches in New Jersey
Religious organizations established in 1834
Gothic Revival church buildings in New Jersey
Historic district contributing properties in New Jersey
1834 establishments in New Jersey
National Register of Historic Places in Somerset County, New Jersey
20th-century Reformed Church in America church buildings
Stone churches in New Jersey